Desert Commandos (Italian: Attentato ai tre grandi) is a 1967 French/Italian/West German international co-production war film set during World War II in Morocco where it was filmed. The Italian title (Attack on the Big Three) refers to a German commando group with a mission to assassinate Churchill, Roosevelt and de Gaulle at the Casablanca Conference.

The film is a character-based drama that focuses on the German soldiers' various drives and conflicts during encounters with Tuareg nomads, and French and American soldiers.

Plot
The grief-stricken Captain Fritz Schoeller has assisted his terminally ill wife with her wishes for euthanasia. A party of men whisk him from his wife's funeral, not for arrest, but to be briefed on a special mission he will lead. The Captain, Lt. Roland Wolf,  Sgt. Erich Huber, Corporal Hans Ludwig and Private Willy Mainz are all skilled in commando tactics and have excellent English language skills. They are dressed in British Commando uniforms and parachuted into Morocco where Faddja Hassen, an Arab woman will guide them to Casablanca where they will assassinate Allied leaders.

Cast 
 Ken Clark: Captain Fritz Schoeller
 Horst Frank: Lt. Roland Wolf
 Jeanne Valérie: Faddja Hassen
 Carlo Hintermann: Sgt. Erich Huber
 Howard Ross: Willy Mainz
 Franco Fantasia: Major Dalio
 Hardy Reichelt: Corporal Hans Ludwig
 Fabienne Dali: Simone
 John Stacy: Sir Bryan
 Tom Felleghy: Colonel Ross
 Gianni Rizzo: Perrier

Release 
The film was released in West Germany on March 15, 1968, as Fünf gegen Casablanca.

References

Sources

External links 

1968 war films
West German films
Italian war films
Films directed by Umberto Lenzi
Films set in Morocco
North African campaign films
Films produced by Alberto Grimaldi
Constantin Film films
French World War II films
German World War II films
Italian World War II films
Macaroni Combat films
1960s Italian films
1960s French films
1960s German films